Canarium pilosum subsp. borneensis is a subspecies of Canarium pilosum. It is a tree in the family Burseraceae. The subspecies is named for Borneo.

Description
The bark is smooth and pale brown. Stipules are absent in this subspecies.

Distribution and habitat
Canarium pilosum subsp. borneensis is endemic to Borneo and occurs uncommonly.

References

pilosum subsp. borneensis
Endemic flora of Borneo
Trees of Borneo
Plant subspecies